Jean Rousseau may refer to:

Jean-Baptiste Rousseau (1671–1741), French dramatist and poet
Jean Baptiste Rousseau (fur trader) (1758–1812), merchant and fur trader 
Jean-Jacques Rousseau (1712–1778), philosopher
Jean-Loup Rousseau (born 1970), Tahitian international footballer
Jean Rousseau (violist) (1644–1699), French musician
Jean Rousseau (politician) (born 1961), Canadian Member of Parliament